Eremias nikolskii, commonly known as the Kirghiz racerunner, is a species of lizard in the family Lacertidae. The species is endemic to Central Asia.

Etymology
The specific name, nikolskii, is in honor of Russian herpetologist Alexander Nikolsky.

Geographic range
E. nikolskii is found in Kazakhstan, Kyrgyzstan, Tajikistan, and Uzbekistan.

Behavior
E. nikolskii is diurnal.

Reproduction
E. nikolskii is oviparous.

References

Further reading
Bedriaga J (1905). "Eremias nikolskii, new species". p. 478. In: Nikolsky A (1905). "Herpetologia rossica ". Mémoires de l'Académie des Sciences de St.-Petersbourg 17 (1): 1–518.
Sindaco, Roberto; Jeremčenko, Valery K. (2008). The Reptiles of the Western Palearctic. 1. Annotated Checklist and Distributional Atlas of the Turtles, Crocodiles, Amphisbaenians and Lizards of Europe, North Africa, Middle East and Central Asia. (Monographs of the Societas Herpetologica Italica). Latina, Italy: Edizioni Belvedere. 580 pp. . 

Eremias
Reptiles described in 1905
Taxa named by Jacques von Bedriaga